Hiloa variabilis, common name the minute pheasant, is a species of small sea snail with calcareous opercula, a marine gastropod mollusk in the family Phasianellidae, the pheasant snails.

Description
The thin, ovate, rather solid shell has a moderately long and shining spire. Its height is 5 mm. The 3-4 convexly rounded whorls are marked with very fine oblique longitudinal striae. The inner lip is callous, slightly expanded at the base, indented at the umbilical region and with a groove behind the inner lip. The aperture is ovate. The color of the shell is white, variously painted with pink lines and blotches. These lines are fine, oblique, and extend over a portion of the whorls. They are sometimes flexuous and cover the whole surface. The blotches have a longitudinal shape. The periphery of the body whorl usually ornamented with a row of pink spots. The axis is perforate. The peristome  does not project forward at  junction  of  columellar and  basal margins.

Distribution
This species occurs in the tropical and temperate Indo-West Pacific, off Hawaii and off Australia.

References

External links
 To Barcode of Life (1 barcode)
 To Biodiversity Heritage Library (3 publications)
 To GenBank (3 nucleotides; 2 proteins)
 To ITIS
 To World Register of Marine Species
 
 Pease, W. H. (1861). Descriptions of forty-seven new species of shells from the Sandwich Islands, in the collection of Hugh Cuming. Proceedings of the Zoological Society of London. 28: 431-438
 Pilsbry, H.A. (1917). Marine mollusks of Hawaii, I-III. Proceedings of the Academy of Natural Sciences of Philadelphia. 69: 207-230, pls 14-15
 Laseron, C. F. (1955). The identity of Phasianella virgo. Proceedings of the Royal Zoological Society of New South Wales. (1953-1954): 77-78
 Angas, G. F. (1867). Descriptions of thirty-two species of marine shells from the coast of New South Wales. Proceedings of the Zoological Society of London. (1867): 110-117, pl. 13
 Pilsbry, H. A. (1895). Catalogue of the marine shells of Japan with descriptions of new species and notes on others collected by Frederick Stearns. F. Stearns, Detroit, viii + 196 pp, 11 pls
  Herbert D.G. (2015). An annotated catalogue and bibliography of the taxonomy, synonymy and distribution of the Recent Vetigastropoda of South Africa (Mollusca). Zootaxa. 4049(1): 1-98

Phasianellidae
Gastropods described in 1860